Nikita Sharma is an Indian actress who primarily works in Hindi television. She made her acting debut with V The Serial portraying Taani in 2013. She earned recognition with her portrayal of Antara Kaul in Do Dil Ek Jaan, Kavita Roy in Swaragini - Jodein Rishton Ke Sur and Lakshmi in Mahakali — Anth Hi Aarambh Hai. 

Her other notable work include portraying Archana Kapoor in Shakti - Astitva Ke Ehsaas Ki and Nandini/Shivani in Phir Laut Aayi Naagin.

Early life
Sharma was born and brought up in New Delhi. She completed her graduation from Delhi University.

Personal life
Sharma married producer Rohandeep Singh on 14 November 2021, at a Shiv Temple in Uttarakhand.

Career

Debut and breakthrough (2013-2016)
Sharma started her career as a model and made her acting debut in 2013 with V The Serial portraying Taani. She then portrayed Antara Kaul in Do Dil Ek Jaan opposite Ayaz Ahmed. It proved as a major turning point in her career. The same year she portrayed Tara in Confessions of an Indian Teenager. 

In 2014, she portrayed episodic role of Pragya in Yeh Hai Aashiqui, Simone in MTV Webbed, Payal in Halla Bol, Koyal in Pyaar Tune Kya Kiya, Mahi in MTV Fanaah and Urmi in Love by Chance . She also portrayed Tania in Phir Jeene Ki Tamanna Hai, in the same year.

She portrayed Vedika in Maharakshak: Devi and Misha in Aahat, both in 2015. From 2015 to 2016, she portrayed Kavita Roy in Swaragini - Jodein Rishton Ke Sur opposite Varun Kapoor.

Success and recent work (2017-present)
Sharma in 2017, portrayed Gauri Shivam Kumar opposite Himanshu Soni in Khatmal E Ishq... Biwi Ke Naakhre..Offo !!. She portrayed Lakshmi opposite Kanan Malhotra in Mahakali — Anth Hi Aarambh Hai from 2017 to 2018.

In 2019, she appeared in Manmohini portraying Rani Rajrajeshwari and then portrayed Archana Kapoor in Shakti - Astitva Ke Ehsaas Ki opposite Vivian Dsena.

From 2019 to 2020 she portrayed dual characters of Nandini (Naagin) and Shivani opposite Jatin Bharadwaj in Phir Laut Aayi Naagin. She then portrayed an Ichhadhari Naagin in Akbar Ka Bal Birbal in 2020.

Filmography

Television

Music videos

References

External links
 
 

Living people
21st-century Indian actresses
Indian television actresses
Indian soap opera actresses
Actresses from New Delhi
Delhi University alumni
Year of birth missing (living people)